Ashk is an ancient male given name of Iranian origin. It also appears as  Aršaka,  Aršak, or Arsaces.

The name was held by the first kings of the Parthian (Arsacid) dynasty, as well as some Armenians.

Places
 Arshak or Asaak, a capital city of Parthian Empire

People
 Arshak II of Arsacid Armenia
 Arshak or Artaxias I of Iberia
 Arshak II of Iberia
 Ashk Dahlén (born 1972), Swedish Iranologist and linguist
 Ibrahim Khan Gauri, pen name Ashk

External links 
 Arsacid Empire - About the name "Ashk"

Persian masculine given names
Persian words and phrases